Eckington Cemetery  is a cemetery in Eckington, Derbyshire, England. The cemetery serves Eckington itself, as well as nearby villages such as Mosborough and Ridgeway.The cemetery features a number of Commonwealth War Graves.

History
The cemetery has been in use since late 1877; prior to this burials took place in the churchyard of St Peter and St Paul's Church. The first interment was for a William Poole, the young son of Charles Poole of Mosborough. The Chapel of Ease located in the cemetery has been Grade II listed since 1989.

The cemetery includes the graves of four confirmed casualties from World War I.

In December 2008, ten Roman coins were discovered near the cemetery, presenting evidence of Roman settlement in the area.

See also
Listed buildings in Eckington, Derbyshire

References

External links
 

Cemeteries in England
Grade II listed buildings in Derbyshire
1877 establishments in England
Commonwealth War Graves Commission cemeteries in England
Eckington, Derbyshire